Josiah Augustus "Si" Spaulding (December 21, 1922 – March 27, 1983) was an American businessman, attorney, and politician.

Education and military service
Spaulding graduated from the Hotchkiss School and Yale University in 1947, where he was a member of Skull and Bones. He served three years as a pilot for the US Marine Corps during World War II and was discharged as a first lieutenant.  He attended Columbia Law School.

Politics 
Spaulding served as the chairman of the Massachusetts Republican Party from 1967 to 1969. He was the Republican nominee for United States Senator in 1970 and Massachusetts Attorney General in 1974. Spaulding was elected to Common Cause's National Governing Board in 1973.

Law 
Spaudling was a partner in the Boston law firm of Bingham Dana & Gould.

Business 
Spaulding was the longtime chairman of Beverly Hospital in Beverly, Massachusetts.

Spaulding was one of the founders of the Massachusetts Rehabilitation Hospital. Following his death, the hospital would be renamed the Spaulding Rehabilitation Hospital in his honor.

Personal life 
Spaulding was married to Helen Bowdoin Spaulding, an activist and philanthropist who served as the president of the New England Aquarium and vice chairman of the board of trustees of Georgetown University.

He died of a heart attack in 1983 in San Juan, Puerto Rico.

Spaulding's son, Josiah Spaulding Jr., is the president and CEO of the Citi Performing Arts Center.

References 

1922 births
1983 deaths
Businesspeople from Massachusetts
Massachusetts lawyers
Massachusetts Republican Party chairs
People from Beverly, Massachusetts
Hotchkiss School alumni
Yale University alumni
Columbia Law School alumni
United States Marine Corps pilots of World War II
20th-century American lawyers
20th-century American businesspeople
Military personnel from Massachusetts